Khotogor is a rural locality (an ulus) in Zaigrayevsky District, Republic of Buryatia, Russia. The population was 47 as of 2010. There is 1 street.

Geography 
Khotogor is located 34 km north of Zaigrayevo (the district's administrative centre) by road. Naryn-Atsagat is the nearest rural locality.

References 

Rural localities in Zaigrayevsky District